The  were medium Imperial Japanese Navy submarines in commission during the 1920s. They were Japan's first true seagoing submarines and the earliest Japanese submarines classified as "second-class" or "medium" submarines.

Design and description
The Type F submarines were designed by the Italian firm Fiat-Laurenti and built under license by Kawasaki at Kobe, Japan. The Type F submarines were the Imperial Japanese Navy′s first true seagoing submarines, and when the Japanese adopted a three-tiered classification system of its submarines as first-class (I), second-class or medium (Ro), and third-class (Ha) on 1 November 1924, the Type F submarines were the earliest to receive the second-class classification, as reflected in their low numbers in the Ro series, and in fact they were the earliest Japanese submarine classified as anything higher than third-class.

As built, Type F submarines had no deck gun, but soon after they were completed each of them had a /40 gun installed on her deck. The Type F submarines had non-cylindrical hulls intended to provide extra internal space, but the Japanese considered the hulls weak despite the provision of additional scantlings during construction to reinforce them. Because of their disappointing performance, they did not serve as the basis for any later Japanese submarine classes.

Class variants
The Type F  submarines were divided into two subclasses:

Type F1 (Ro-1-class)

The F1 subclass was ordered under the 1915–1916 naval program. Two were constructed between 1917 and 1920:

Type F2 (Ro-3-class)

The F2 subclass (Ro-3-class) was ordered in 1918. It was an improved version of the F1 subclass with a modified bridge. Additional F2 subclass units planned under the 1919 construction program were cancelled and replaced by the new Kaichū-type and Type L submarines.

Three submarines of the F2 subclass were constructed between 1919 and 1922:

Characteristics
Sources

References

Bibliography
 Gray, Randal, ed., Conway′s All the World′s Fighting Ships 1906–1921, Annapolis, Maryland: Naval Institute Press, 1985, .

F type submarine
 
Submarines of the Imperial Japanese Navy